Arthur Chichester, 1st Earl of Donegall (16 June 1606 – 18 March 1675), was an Anglo-Irish peer and soldier.

Origins
He was the eldest son and heir of The 1st Viscount Chichester, from Eggesford, Devon, by his first wife Anne Copleston, heiress of Eggesford.

Career
He made a career as a soldier before being elected to the Irish House of Commons as Member of Parliament for Antrim in 1634 and again in 1640. Having distinguished himself in helping to put down the rebellion which took place in Ulster in 1641, Chichester was admitted to the Privy Council of Ireland in 1643. It was on the advice of James Butler, 1st Duke of Ormonde, Lord Lieutenant of Ireland, that in 1647 he was created Earl of Donegall in the Peerage of Ireland. The earldom was created with a special remainder to the male heirs of his father, whom he succeeded a year later as 2nd Viscount Chichester and Governor of Carrickfergus for life. He took his seat in the Irish House of Lords in 1661. In 1668 he endowed a mathematical lectureship at Trinity College Dublin with an annuity of 30 livre (pounds), which lectureship survives as an annual public lecture at the School of Mathematics in Trinity College.

Marriages and children
He married three times: 
Firstly to Dorcas Hill (1607–1630), a daughter of John Hill of Honiley, Warwickshire, (whose arms are shown on her monument in Eggesford Church: Sable, six talbot hounds argent, 3,2,1) by whom he had one daughter:
Mary Chichester, wife of John St Leger and mother of Arthur St Leger, 1st Viscount Doneraile (died 1727). 
Secondly to Lady Mary Digby (d. 1648), daughter of John Digby, 1st Earl of Bristol, (whose arms are shown on her monument in Eggesford Church: Azure, a fleur de lys argent) by whom he had eight children all of whom died young.  
Thirdly in 1651 he married Letitia Hicks, daughter of Sir William Hicks, 1st Baronet, by whom he had surviving children one son and one daughter, four other daughters having died young:
William Chichester 
Anne Chichester (died 1697) who married firstly John Butler, 1st Earl of Gowran and secondly Francis Aungier, 1st Earl of Longford.

Death and burial
Lord Donegall died after a short illness in Belfast in 1675 and was buried in St Nicholas's Church, Carrickfergus.

Succession
As all his sons had died young, the earldom passed under the remainder to his nephew Arthur Chichester.

References

1606 births
1675 deaths
Members of the Privy Council of Ireland
Chichester, Arthur
Chichester, Arthur
People associated with Trinity College Dublin
Arthur
People from County Antrim
Irish soldiers
Members of the Parliament of Ireland (pre-1801) for County Antrim constituencies
1
Peers of Ireland created by Charles I